Burton  “Burkie” Burns (born October 27, 1952) most recently was the running backs coach of the New York Giants of the National Football League (NFL). Burns previously was a coach at Alabama from 2007 until 2017, where he had been the associate head coach and running backs coach for the team. He was the running backs coach at Clemson from 1999-2006, and prior to that he was an assistant coach at Tulane from 1994–1998.

Playing career
Burns played fullback at Nebraska (1972-1976) under head coach Tom Osborne. He was a player on three Cornhusker teams that won nine plus games. Burns participated in bowl games such as the Orange Bowl, Cotton Bowl, and the Sugar Bowl. He earned a bachelor's degree in education from Nebraska in 1976.

Family 
Burns is married to the former Connie Winder. Together, the couple has four children: three daughters, Amber, Christy, and Erin, and a son, Damon. In addition, they have two grandchildren, one granddaughter, and one grandson.

References

External links
 Alabama Crimson Tide bio

1952 births
Living people
African-American coaches of American football
African-American players of American football
American football fullbacks
Alabama Crimson Tide football coaches
Clemson Tigers football coaches
High school football coaches in Louisiana
Nebraska Cornhuskers football players
New York Giants coaches
Players of American football from New Orleans
Southern Jaguars football coaches
St. Augustine High School (New Orleans) alumni
Tulane Green Wave football coaches
21st-century African-American people
20th-century African-American sportspeople